Johann Baptist Metz (5 August 1928 – 2 December 2019) was a German Catholic priest and theologian. He was Ordinary Professor of Fundamental Theology at the University of Münster, and a consultant to the synod of German dioceses. He is regarded as one of the most important German theologians after the Second Vatican Council, who influenced liberation theology and focused on compassion.

Life and career 
Metz was born on 5 August 1928 in Auerbach in der Oberpfalz and grew up there. As a teenager, Metz was drafted into the German military in 1944, towards the end of the Second World War. Six months before the end of the war, he was captured by the Americans and sent to prisoner of war camps in Maryland and then Virginia. After the war, he moved back to Germany. He studied theology and philosophy from 1948, first in Bamberg, then in Munich and at the University of Innsbruck, He completed his dissertation on the philosophy of Martin Heidegger in 1951. Metz was ordained a priest in 1954, working in ministry from 1958 to 1961. He was then promoted to Ph.D., with a work on the theology of Thomas Aquinas under the supervision of Karl Rahner. His experience in the war matches that of the German Calvinist theologian Jürgen Moltmann who would go on to write with Metz on political theology against a background of direct confrontation with Nazism. In 1962–63, he was granted a scholarship from the Deutsche Forschungsgemeinschaft.

He was professor of Fundamental Theology at the University of Münster from 1963 to 1993, where he developed a Theology after Auschwitz (Holocaust theology). He introduced philosophical and political ideas of 1968, by Ernst Bloch and the Frankfurt School of Max Horkheimer and Theodor W. Adorno, in theology, which was received with opposition. His concepts were applied by the liberation theology in Latin America. He participated in the founding of the University of Bielefeld, and was a leading member of the international Paulus-Gesellschaft dedicated to a dialogue of Christianity and Marxism. After the Second Vatican Council, he was a consultant of the papal secretariate for the noncredentibus from 1968 to 1973. Metz was a consultant of the Würzburg Synod of the German dioceses from 1971 to 1975, and was the principal author of its document "Unsere Hoffnung" (Our hope) which became a key document for the reception of the Second Vatican Council in Germany.

Metz lived in Münster until his death on 2 December 2019.

Theology 

A student of Karl Rahner, Metz broke with Rahner's transcendental theology in a turn to a theology rooted in praxis. Metz was at the centre of a school of political theology that strongly influenced liberation theology. He is regarded as one of the most influential post–Vatican II German theologians. His thought turned around fundamental attention to the suffering of others. Key topics of his theology were memory, solidarity, and narrative. Works in English include: The Emergent Church, Faith in History and Society, Poverty of Spirit, and Hope Against Hope. Collected articles can be found in A Passion for God: The Mystical-Political Dimension of Christianity, translated by Matthew Ashley and in John K. Downey, ed., Love's Strategy: The Political Theology of Johann Baptist Metz.

Fundamental to Metz's work is the concept of "dangerous memory", which relates to anamnesis in the Greek New Testament, a term which is central to the theology of the Eucharist. Metz spoke variously of "the dangerous memory of Jesus Christ", "the dangerous memory of freedom (in Jesus Christ)", the "dangerous memory of suffering", etc. One of the motivating factors for this category is Metz's determination, as a Christian theologian from Germany, to rework the whole of Christian theology from the ground up in light of the disruptive experience of the Holocaust. This need explains in part his break with Rahner, whose transcendental method appeals to historicity but does not come to terms with actual history. Metz was in dialogue with progressive Marxism, especially Walter Benjamin and the authors of the Frankfurt School. He levelled a fierce critique of what he called bourgeois Christianity and believed that the Christian Gospel had become less credible because it had become entangled with bourgeois religion. His work Faith in History and Society develops apologetics, or fundamental theology, from this perspective.

A key motif of his theology is compassion, as a sensitivity for the suffering of others, a compassion of God, and also a passion for God ("Leidempfindlichkeit für andere, die Mitleidenschaft Gottes, auch die Leidenschaft für Gott").

Works 

 Metz, Johann Baptist (1969). Theology of the World, trans. William Glen-Doepel. New York: Seabury. 
 Metz, Johann Baptist (1980). Faith in History and Society: Toward a Practical Fundamental Theology. New York: Seabury. 
 Metz, Johann Baptist (1998). Poverty in Spirit. New York: Paulist Press.

References

External links 

 The political theology, life, and works of Metz: https://www.johannbaptistmetz.com.
 
 
 Chapter 17. Johann Baptist Metz. Blackwell Publishing. Abstract of The Blackwell Companion to Political Theology. Retrieved 1 March 2011.
 Johann Baptist Metz (1928 - 2019) philos-website.de
 "Einer der einflussreichsten Theologen seit dem Zweiten Vatikanischen Konzil" / Theologe Johann Baptist Metz erhält NRW-Landesverdienstorden (in German) kirche-und-leben.de 7 December 2019
 Ministerpräsident Armin Laschet würdigt Johann Baptist Metz als einen der bedeutendsten Theologen unserer Zeit North Rhine-Westphalia 15 February 2019
 Johann Baptist Metz Gesammelte Schriften (11 Artikel) Verlag Herder

1928 births
2019 deaths
20th-century German Catholic theologians
German male non-fiction writers
Academic staff of the University of Münster
Political theologians
People from Amberg-Sulzbach